With One Voice may refer to:

Films
 The 2009 documentary With One Voice

Hymnals
 The international edition of the Australian Hymn Book
 A supplement to the Lutheran Book of Worship